The Missouri School of Journalism at the University of Missouri in Columbia is one of the oldest formal journalism schools in the world. The school provides academic education and practical training in all areas of journalism and strategic communication for undergraduate and graduate students across several media including television and radio broadcasting, newspapers, magazines, photography, and new media. The school also supports a robust advertising and public relations curriculum.

Founded by Walter Williams in 1908, the school publishes the city's Columbia Missourian newspaper and produces news programming for the market's NBC-TV affiliate and NPR member radio station. Considered one of the top journalism schools in the world, it is known for its "Missouri Method," through which students learn about journalism in the classroom as well as practicing it in multimedia laboratories and real-world outlets. It also operates an international journalists’ magazine, a local city magazine, a statewide business journal, a statehouse news bureau, and two student-staffed advertising and public relations agencies.

Several affiliated professional organizations, including Investigative Reporters and Editors and the Pictures of the Year International, allow students to interact with working journalists.

In 1930, the school established its Missouri Honor Medal for Distinguished Service in Journalism. The faculty selects medalists based on lifetime or superior achievement for distinguished service; each year a different aspect of journalism is selected for recognition. In 1960, the school established the Penney-Missouri Awards to recognise women's page journalism "that went beyond traditional content." In 1994 the awards were renamed the Missouri Lifestyle Journalism Awards.

History

The school opened on September 14, 1908.  Its founding was urged by Joseph Pulitzer, following lobbying by Walter Williams, the editor of the Columbia (Missouri) Herald and a university curator.  Williams became the official founder.  This came 13 years after the defeat in the Missouri State Senate of a bill to establish a chair of journalism at the University of Missouri.  Previously newspapers usually required apprenticeships.  The Missouri Press Association began supporting the proposal in 1896.

The first day's class published the first issue of the University Missourian, which was to become the Columbia Missourian.  Williams was the first dean.  Among the original faculty members was Charles Griffith Ross, who would become press secretary for President Harry S. Truman. It was initially based in Switzler Hall.

In 1910, the school began its Journalism Week celebration. On March 10, Kappa Tau Alpha was founded.

In 1919, Jay Holcomb Neff Hall, the first building formally assigned to the school, was built by a donation from Andrew Neff, a 1913 journalism graduate, in honor of his late father, a former Kansas City, Missouri mayor and publisher.  At the time, it was the largest donation in the university history.

In 1921, the school offered the world's first master's degree in journalism. In 1930, it created the Missouri Honor Medal for Distinguished Service in Journalism. In 1934, it offered the world's first Doctor of Philosophy degree in journalism.  In 1936, the school began offering broadcast courses in conjunction with KFRU, the radio station owned by the St. Louis Star-Times.

In 1944, Professor Clifton C. Edom and his wife Vi, in association with the school, developed the "News Pictures of Year Competition and Exhibition," now "Pictures of the Year International". A year later, they started the "College Photograph of the Year" program.

In 1953, the university launched KOMU-TV, the only university-owned full-power commercial television station in the US, used as a training lab for students who provide its news programming. In 1958, the school opened the Freedom of Information Center, the world's first academic center dedicated to the topic. In 1971, the school switched its radio news programming to KBIA, a National Public Radio station.

In 1957, George McElroy, a pioneering black journalist from Texas, became the first African American to receive a master's degree in journalism from the university.

In 1981, the school was ranked the top journalism school in the country, under dean Roy M. Fisher. In February 2004, the Donald W. Reynolds Foundation awarded the School $31 million, the largest private donation ever to the University of Missouri, to create The Reynolds Journalism Institute. In 2008, the Reynolds Institute opened, offering advanced studies of journalism and its role in democratic societies.

In 2010, the school revamped its curriculum so undergraduate students could choose from an array of more than 30 interest areas. These are designed to build expertise in areas in which journalism and strategic communication majors.

Facilities

 The Missouri School of Journalism has eight buildings dedicated to the practice and teaching of journalism. These are Jay H. Neff Hall (1920), Walter Williams Hall and the Journalism Arch (1937), KOMU-TV (1953), Neff Annex (1962), Gannett Hall (1979), Lee Hills Hall (1995) and the Donald W. Reynolds Journalism Institute (2008).

The classrooms and equipment include two high-tech design labs; three writing labs; a digital television editing lab; two major auditoriums with state-of-the-art audiovisual capabilities; an electronic photojournalism laboratory; an advanced computer lab for producing Web-based text, audio and video materials; more than 550 computers; and wireless network access. The Futures Lab and Technology Demonstration Center at the Reynolds Journalism Institute allow students to work alongside professionals and researchers to discover new ways to serve democracy through journalism.

Media outlets
At Missouri, real-world media experience is part of the curriculum. As part of the "Missouri Method" of hands-on journalism education, undergraduate and graduate students work at the School's community-based real-media outlets. News is delivered using traditional, digital, online and mobile formats. The outlets include the Columbia Missourian, a daily general-circulation newspaper and website; KOMU-TV, the NBC affiliate for mid-Missouri; KBIA-FM, an NPR member station; Vox, a monthly entertainment magazine; Missouri Business Alert, a digital newsroom that publishes the top business news from across the state;  Missouri Digital News, a state government reporting program based in Jefferson City; Global Journalist, a converged newsroom producing digital, broadcast, print and mobile content for local and global audiences; Mojo Ad, a student-staffed agency that focuses on the 18-to-24 age Youth and Young Adult (YAYA) market; and AdZou, the strategic communication capstone agency.

Reynolds Journalism Institute
The Reynolds Journalism Institute (RJI) is a center for researching and testing new models of journalism in an era of technological advances. RJI makes the most of its location at the Missouri School of Journalism and the extensive resources at the university. It also takes advantage of the collective creativity of visiting professionals and researchers.

RJI was launched in 2004 with an initial grant of $31 million from the Donald W. Reynolds Foundation. In conjunction with the centennial celebration of the School, it dedicated its world headquarters on September 12, 2008. This  facility has state-of-the-art resources to test and demonstrate new technologies, experiment with convergence news production and delivery systems, and conduct real-time and virtual seminars and conferences.

RJI's work crosses diverse specialties within journalism, including media convergence, editorial content and methods, the evolution of advertising, innovation in management and the impact of new technologies. It also includes varied fields on campus such as law, computer science, marketing, education and other disciplines.

In the Futures Lab, interdisciplinary teams of journalism, business, and computer science students work together to create the future of journalism.

Endowed chairs

The School has 10 endowed chairs:

1982: Goldenson Chair in Local Broadcasting
The Goldenson Chair in Local Broadcasting helps develop research programs and educate communities through local broadcast stations. The chair is named for Leonard Goldenson (1905–1999), who founded the American Broadcasting Company.

1986: Meredith Chair in Service Journalism
The Meredith Corporation, based in Des Moines, Iowa, established an endowed chair in service journalism at the Missouri School of Journalism in 1986.

1995: Lee Hills Chair in Free-Press Studies
Lee Hills had a long and varied newspaper career; he worked as a reporter, foreign correspondent, news editor, editorial writer, editor, managing editor, executive editor, and publisher and CEO of two major newspapers, the Detroit Free Press and the Miami Herald. Hills, who attended the Missouri School of Journalism between 1927 and 1929, was also the first chairman and CEO of Knight-Ridder Newspapers.

1997: Knight Chair in Journalism
The John S. and James L. Knight Foundation helped fund an endowed chair and program in editing, recognizing editors as central to the success of a newspaper. The Knight Chair in Journalism and the Knight Center for Editing Excellence, which stimulates innovations in teaching and research on editing, was partially funded by the state of Missouri, which provided a $1.5 million matching grant. Programming at the Knight Center is aimed at educating and assisting high school students, undergraduates, graduate students and mid-career professionals.

1997: Maxine Wilson Gregory Chair in Journalism Research
Maxine Wilson Gregory, an alumna of the Missouri School of Journalism, died in New York City in 1995. She earned a bachelor's degree from the University of Kansas, after which she attended MU, graduating in 1930. Gregory worked as an editor on various book projects after graduation, and a bequest made after her death was used to fund the endowed chair that bears her name.

1998: Houston Harte Chair in Journalism
The family of Houston Harte, co-founder of the Harte-Hanks newspaper group, established the Houston Harte Chair in Journalism. Harte, who graduated in 1915, bought his first newspaper while still a student at the Missouri School of Journalism. At the time of his death, he was executive chairman of Harte-Hanks Newspapers, Inc., which owned 19 newspapers and one television station. The Houston Harte Chair works as a teaching editor at the Columbia Missourian, the general-circulation daily newspaper staffed by professors and students.

1998: Curtis B. Hurley Chair in Public Affairs Reporting
When Edgar A. McLaughlin graduated from the Missouri School of Journalism in 1931, he said, "If I ever make any money, I am going to do something for this place." Years later a gift from the E.A. and Lucile McLaughlin estate recognized Curtis B. Hurley, the country editor who, in 1927, both encouraged McLaughlin to study journalism at Missouri, and also lent him $400 to do so. McLaughlin credited Hurley and his experience at the School of Journalism with turning his life around, and left the bulk of his estate to the School.

2000: Missouri Chair in Community Newspaper Management
More than 100 community publishers, alumni of the school, and friends of Missouri Press Association and the school made contributions to make this endowed chair possible. The Chair in Community Newspaper Management is a joint effort by the School and the MPA to strengthen and promote the teaching of community newspapering.

2000: Society of American Business Editors and Writers Endowed Missouri Chair in Business and Financial Journalism
The SABEW Chair in Business and Financial Journalism is a joint effort by the School and the Society of American Business Editors and Writers to strengthen and promote the teaching of business journalism. Headquartered at the Missouri School of Journalism, SABEW is an organization of more than 3,200 dedicated business and financial writers and editors.

2008: Donald W. Reynolds Endowed Chair in Business Journalism
The Donald W. Reynolds Foundation awarded the School a $2 million grant to establish the Donald W. Reynolds Endowed Chair in Business Journalism in 2008. The chair is the second in business journalism at the School, joining the Society of American Business Editors and Writers Chair, established in 2000. Working with other faculty and staff of Reynolds Journalism Institute, the Reynolds Chair helps develop, test and write about new digital models of journalism and advertising.

Student groups

Students can participate in more than a dozen student groups, most affiliated with national organizations. These include AAF Mizzou, American Copy Editors Society; Association for Women in Sports Media; Journalism Ambassadors; Journalism Student Council; Kappa Alpha Mu; Magazine Club; National Association of Black Journalists (Alé Chapter); Online News Association; Queer Media Association (QMA); Radio Television Digital News Association; Society of Professional Journalists; the Student Society of News Design; and Women in Media.

Professional organizations
Ten professional organizations and programs affiliated with the School allow students to interact with working journalists and news-related organizations:  
 American Society of News Editors; 
 Association of Health Care Journalists; 
 Center for Excellence in Health Care Journalism; 
 Investigative Reporters and Editors and its subsidiary 
 National Institute for Computer-Assisted Reporting (NICAR); 
 Journalism and Women's Symposium; 
 Missouri Interscholastic Press Association; 
 National Freedom of Information Coalition; 
 Pictures of the Year International; and 
 Religion Newswriters Association.

Accreditation
Accrediting Council on Education in Journalism and Mass Communications.

Notable alumni

John Anderson – ESPN Sportscenter anchor
Gerald M. Boyd – Former Managing Editor, The New York Times
Russ Buettner — Pulitzer Prize winning reporter for The New York Times
Jann Carl – Former correspondent for Entertainment Tonight
Sophia Choi – Former CNN host/reporter
Pat Forde – Former columnist for ESPN, current columnist for Sports Illustrated
Martin Frost – Former U.S. Representative from Texas's 24th district
Major Garrett – CBS News Chief White House Correspondent
Marie Hansen – Life photojournalist
Adrian Holovaty – Creator of the Django (web framework)
Haynes Johnson – Pulitzer Prize winning reporter
Phil Keating – Fox News National Correspondent
Michael Kim – ESPN Sportscenter anchor
Jim Lehrer – Former Host of PBS NewsHour
Joe Mahr – Pulitzer Prize winning investigative journalist for the Chicago Tribune
Richard Matheson – Horror and sci-fi author whose works include I Am Legend and Somewhere in Time
Mary McNamara – Pulitzer Prize Winning for Criticism 2015
Russ Mitchell – Former anchor of CBS Evening News and The Early Show; current reporter for WKYC
Joel Meyers – Voice of the New Orleans Pelicans
Lisa Myers – Former Investigative reporter with NBC News
Ken Paulson – Former Editor-In-Chief, USA Today
Brad Pitt – Actor (attended; did not graduate)
Chuck Roberts – Former CNN host/reporter
Mark Russell - Executive Editor, The Commercial Appeal and Former Editor, Orlando Sentinel
George C. Scott - Actor (attended; switched his major to English and drama)
Jon Scott – Host of Happening Now on the Fox News Channel
Brad Sham – Voice of the Dallas Cowboys
Ram Subhag Singh – Indian Politician, first Leader of the Opposition in Lok Sabha
Bob Sullivan – New York Times Bestseller and founding member of MSNBC
Wright Thompson – ESPN senior writer
Brian Timpone – Conservative businessman, former TV reporter (KDLH CBS 3) and media entrepreneur
Elizabeth Vargas – Host of ABC News' 20/20, former anchor of World News Tonight
Matt Winer – Former ESPN Sportscenter anchor, current Turner Sports host
Nick Young -- Retired anchor of CBS World News Roundup

References

External links

University of Missouri
Journalism schools in the United States
Educational institutions established in 1908
1908 establishments in Missouri
Missouri Lifestyle Journalism Awards
University subdivisions in Missouri